The Ministry of Shipping (Nauparibahana mantraṇālaẏa) is the government ministry of Bangladesh, the apex body for formulation and administration of the rules and regulations and laws relating to shipping.

Directorates
Bangladesh Inland Water Transport Authority
Bangladesh Inland Water Transport Corporation
Bangladesh Land Port Authority
Bangladesh Marine Academy
Bangladesh Shipping Corporation
Chittagong Port Authority
Department of Shipping
Mongla Port Authority
National Maritime Institute
Payra Port Authority

See also 
 ABM Zahidul Haq, former Bangladesh Deputy Minister of Shipping
 Bangladesh Marine Fisheries Academy

References

 
Shipping
Shipping in Bangladesh
Shipping ministries